The 1928 United States Senate election in California was held on November 6, 1928. Incumbent Republican Senator Hiram Johnson was re-elected to his third term in office. He defeated Democrat Minor Moore and Prohibition Party nominee Los Angeles City Councilman Charles H. Randall.

Primaries
Primaries were held on August 28.

Republican primary

Candidates
 Hiram Johnson, incumbent Senator
 Charles H. Randall, Los Angeles City Councilman (cross-filing)

Results

Democratic primary

Candidates
 Minor Moore, Judge of the California Court of Appeals

Results
Judge Minor Moore was unopposed on the ballot, but some primary voters wrote in Hiram Johnson or Charles Randall.

Prohibition primary

Candidates
Wiley J. Phillips
Charles H. Randall, Los Angeles City Councilman

Results

Third parties and independents

Socialist
 Lena Morrow Lewis, nominee for Lt. Governor in 1926

General election

Results

See also 
  1928 United States Senate elections

References 

1928 California elections
California
1928